Charles Awurum  is a Nigerian actor and comedian.

Early life
Awurum grew up in Lagos State and had aspirations to be a professional actor whilst from a young age. He wrote to the producers of Village Headmaster (discontinued Nigerian soap opera) that he aspired to be part of the soap opera cast. Eventually he got an invitation from the producers, but could not feature on the show due to his young age and minimal support from the people and his local community. He stuck to acting drama in church as well as his school he attended.

Career
Awrum started out acting in his church as well as his school so as of the time of graduation from college, he was already a good and versatile actor, he came into Nollywood taking only 'serious' roles, he later at a point in his career decided to do only comedy roles which in initial stage and conception of this idea, he was denied due to his "mean looks".

Endorsement deals
In 2014, Awurum became a brand ambassador for multinational telecommunications company Globacom owned by Nigerian businessman Mike Adenuga.

Hosting award shows 
The 2016 'Award of Excellence', organized by Magic Lens Africa Film Academy Awards (MAFAA), was hosted by Charles Awurum.

Personal life 
Awurum has been married since 2005 and has 3 children. He is of the opinion that God will punish all those that fail to vote in the upcoming 2023 general election.

Selected filmography
Trusted Enemy (2016) as JohnBull
Trusted Enemy II (2016)
Gold Dust Ikenga (2015) as Raymond
Jack & Jill (2011) as Kelvin
Jack & Jill II (2011) as Kelvin
Most Wanted Kidnappers (2010) as Mgada
Most Wanted Kidnappers II (2010) as Magda
Yahooze Prophets (2009)
Yahooze Prophets II (2009)
Marcus D Millionaire (2008)
Marcus D Millionaire II (2008)
Away Match (2007)
Away Match II (2007)
Fools On The Run (2007)
Game Fools Play (2007) as Theo
Game Fools Play II (2007) as Theo
JohnBull & Rosekate (2007)
Lost In The Jungle (2007) as Anthony
Lost In The Jungle II (2007) as Anthony
Toronto Connection (2007)
Toronto Connection II (2007)
Four Forty (2006)
Four Forty II (2006)
Silence Of The Gods (2006)
Silence Of The Gods II (2006)
Store Keeper (2006)
Store Keeper II (2006)
The Barrister (2006) as Jonah
The Barrister II (2006) as Jonah
The Journalist (2006)
The Journalist II (2006)
Friends & Lovers (2005)
Friends & Lovers II (2005)
I Need A Man (2005)
I Need A Man II (2005)
Nothing For Nothing (2005)
Nothing For Nothing II (2005)
Nothing For Nothing III (2005)
No Way Out (2005)
No Way Out II (2005)
A Million Madness (2004)
Love & Marriage (2004)
World Apart (2004)
World Apart II (2004)
Under Fire (2003)
Sweet Banana (2003)
Sweet Banana II (2003)
Battle Line (2002)
Battle Line II (2002)
Ifeonye Metalu (2002)
Wisdom & Riches (2002)
Wisdom & Riches II (2002)

Tv Series
New Masquerade

See also
List of Nigerian actors
List of Nigerian Comedians

References

External links

Living people
Male actors from Lagos State
University of Calabar alumni
Year of birth missing (living people)
Igbo male actors
Nigerian male film actors
Nigerian comedians
Igbo comedians
Nigerian film producers
Nigerian film directors
Nigerian philanthropists
Nigerian television personalities
Actors from Imo State
People from Imo State